Henry Houldsworth may refer to:

Henry Houldsworth of the Houldsworth Baronets
Henry Houldsworth, Lord Lieutenant of Moray